Chowdepalle is a village in Chittoor district of the Indian state of Andhra Pradesh. It is the mandal headquarters of Chowdepalli mandal.

Demographics
As per 2011 census, there are 1542 households with a total population of 6911 in the village of Chowdepalle. Out of this 3467 are females and 3444 are males.

References 

Villages in Chittoor district
Mandal headquarters in Chittoor district